Muhammad Al-Saggaf is the 6th President of King Fahd University of Petroleum and Minerals. He started his career at KFUPM then spent 30 years in the industry at Saudi Aramco, culminating in his position as Senior Vice President of Operations and Business Services for six years, before re-joining the University in January, 2020.

Early life and education

Born in Jeddah, Saudi Arabia, Al-Saggaf moved after high school to the Eastern Province to attend King Fahd University of Petroleum and Minerals, from which he earned a B.S. degree in Mathematics. He later earned M.S. and Ph.D. degrees in Geophysics from the Massachusetts Institute of Technology, and an MBA from KFUPM. He is also a graduate of Harvard Business School’s Program for Management Development.

Career

He has received international recognition in Geoscience and Petroleum Engineering, including the J. Clarence Karcher Award from the Society of Exploration Geophysicists (SEG), the Lester C. Uren Technical Excellence Award, and the Distinguished Member Award from the Society of Petroleum Engineers (SPE), and the Eisenhower Fellowship .

References

King Fahd University of Petroleum and Minerals
Massachusetts Institute of Technology alumni
Year of birth missing (living people)
Living people